Richard Brown also referred to as Uncle Rich Brown, was an American blues musician and singer from Alabama, United States. He recorded together with John Lomax in the 1930s and one of his most popular recordings was "Alabama Bound".

References

American blues musicians
1860s births
1940s deaths
Musicians from Alabama
Place of death missing
Year of death uncertain